Colin Peter Greening (born March 9, 1986) is a Canadian former professional ice hockey left winger. He played for the Ottawa Senators and the Toronto Maple Leafs in the National Hockey League (NHL). He was originally drafted by the Senators in the seventh round, 204th overall, in the 2005 NHL Entry Draft.

Playing career
While playing for Upper Canada College in Toronto, Ontario, Greening was selected by the Ottawa Senators in the seventh round, 204th overall, of the 2005 NHL Entry Draft. Greening played four full seasons of NCAA collegiate hockey at Cornell University without missing a single game, serving as captain in his junior and senior year and being selected for membership in the Quill and Dagger society. At Cornell, Greening played on a line with another future NHLer, Riley Nash.

After graduating from Cornell in 2010, Greening joined the Binghamton Senators of the American Hockey League (AHL), the top minor league affiliate of the Ottawa Senators. He made his NHL debut on February 1, 2011, in a game in Newark against the New Jersey Devils. On March 3, 2011, Greening scored his first career NHL goal against the Atlanta Thrashers in a 3–1 Ottawa victory. On May 19, 2011, Greening was signed to a three-year, one-way contract by the Senators that will pay him $700,000 in 2011–12, $800,000 in 2012–13, and $950,000 in 2013–14.

On January 12, 2012, Greening was selected to participate in the NHL YoungStars Game, which coincided with the 2012 All-Star Game held in Ottawa. He finished his rookie season with 17 goals and 37 points while playing in all 82 of Ottawa's games, largely playing on the first line with Daniel Alfredsson and Jason Spezza.

During the 2012–13 NHL lockout, Greening spent time with the Aalborg Pirates of Denmark's AL-Bank Ligaen.

On September 9, 2013, Greening signed a three-year, $7.95 million contract extension that pays him $2 million in 2014–15, $2.75 million in 2015–16 and $3.2 million in 2016–17. Since 2015, his playing time has been split between Ottawa and Binghamton.

On February 9, 2016, Greening was traded to the Toronto Maple Leafs in a nine-player deal which saw Dion Phaneuf going to the Ottawa Senators. Greening would make his Toronto debut two days later against the Edmonton Oilers.

On July 1, 2017, Greening as a free agent opted to remain with the Maple Leafs, re-signing to a one-year, two-way deal. After the conclusion of the 2017–18 season, where the Marlies won their first Calder Cup, Greening signed a one-year AHL contract with the Marlies.

Following the 2018–19 AHL season, Greening retired from professional hockey in order to further his education, enrolling at Harvard Business School to pursue a Master of Business Administration (MBA).

Career statistics

Awards and honors

References

External links

1986 births
Living people
Aalborg Pirates players
Binghamton Senators players
Canadian ice hockey centres
Cornell Big Red men's ice hockey players
Ice hockey people from Newfoundland and Labrador
Nanaimo Clippers players
Ottawa Senators draft picks
Ottawa Senators players
Sportspeople from St. John's, Newfoundland and Labrador
Toronto Maple Leafs players
Toronto Marlies players
Upper Canada College alumni
Canadian expatriate ice hockey players in Denmark
Harvard Business School alumni